The Futurist Painting: Technical Manifesto (1910) by Umberto Boccioni (1882-1916) was the first exposition of the theoretical underpinnings of Italian Futurist painting.

Publication
The manifesto was first published as a leaflet in Poesia, in Milan, 11 April 1910. Apart from Boccioni, it was signed by Carlo Carrà, Luigi Russolo, Giacomo Balla and Gino Severini, although they did not necessarily all contribute to the text. The translation most often used in English is from the Exhibition of Works by the Italian Futurist Painters at the Sackville Gallery in London, March 1912.

Antecedents
The manifesto built on the publication of the Manifesto of Futurism  by Filippo Marinetti in Le Figaro in Paris in 1909 and Boccioni's Manifesto of the Futurist Painters published as a leaflet in Poesia, 11 February 1910, neither of which had described in detail how Futurist ideas would be represented on the canvas.

References

 
Art manifestos
Umberto Boccioni
Futurism
Futurist paintings
 
1910 in art
1910 in Italy
1910 documents